Édouard Delvaux (Brussels, 1806 – Spa, 1862) was a Belgian Romantic painter. The grandson of the sculptor Laurent Delvaux and apprentice of the painter Henri Van Assche, his work mainly consisted of bucolic rural scenes from his many trips to France, Switzerland, Germany and Italy. He won silver medal at the 1836 Brussels exhibition and was director of the École de dessin at Spa.

Sources 
Raymond Delvaux, Flor De Smedt, Felix Meurisse & Frans Jozef van Droogenbroeck, Het Kasteel van Walfergem, van Hof te Huseghem over Speelgoed van de familie t'Kint tot Landhuis van de familie Delvaux, Asse, Koninklijke Heemkring Ascania, Asse, 2007.

External links 
Works and life of Édouard Delvaux

1806 births
1862 deaths
Artists from Brussels
19th-century Belgian painters
19th-century Belgian male artists